Nenezić is a surname. Notable people with the surname include:

Brajan Nenezić (born 1953), Montenegrin footballer
Igor Nenezić (born 1984), Slovenian footballer
Ljubica Nenezić (born 1997), Montenegrin handball player

Serbian surnames
Montenegrin surnames